Bagrichthys obscurus is a species of bagrid catfish which is found in Cambodia, Laos, Thailand and Vietnam where it is found in the Chao Phraya, Bang Pakong and Mekong drainages. It grows to a length of 24.9 cm.

References 
 

Bagridae
Fish of Asia
Fish of Thailand
Fish described in 1999